The Araucaria tit-spinetail (Leptasthenura setaria) is a species of bird in the family Furnariidae. It is found in Argentina and Brazil. Its natural habitats are subtropical or tropical moist montane forest and plantations. It is tightly associated with Araucaria angustifolia ("parana pine") forest. It is becoming rare due to habitat loss.

References

External links
Araucaria tit-spinetail videos on the Internet Bird Collection
Photo; Gallery with text-Leptasthenura setaria www.antpitta.com: "Furnariidae"
Araucaria tit-spinetail photo gallery VIREO

Araucaria tit-spinetail
Birds of the Atlantic Forest
Birds of the South Region
Araucaria tit-spinetail
Taxonomy articles created by Polbot